Chlorobaculum tepidum, previously known as Chlorobium tepidum, is an anaerobic, thermophilic green sulfur bacteria first isolated from New Zealand. Cells are gram-negative and non-motile rods of variable length. They contain bacteriochlorophyll c and chlorosomes.

Genome structure

Chlorobaculum tepidum contains a genome that contains 2.15 Mbp. There are a total of 2,337 genes (of these genes, there are 2,245 protein coding genes and 56 tRNA and rRNA coding genes). It synthesizes chlorophyll a and bacteriochlorophylls (BChls) a and c and is a model organism used to elucidate the biosynthesis of BChl c. Several of its carotenoid metabolic pathways (including a novel lycopene cyclase) have similar counterparts in cyanobacteria.

See also 
 List of bacterial orders
 List of bacteria genera

References

Further reading

External links

Phototrophic bacteria
Chlorobiota
Bacteria described in 1991